is a contactless smart card ticketing and electronic money system used in the Kansai region (and may also be used in some areas of Okayama Prefecture, Hiroshima Prefecture, and Shizuoka Prefecture) of Japan.  The name PiTaPa is an acronym of "Postpay IC for Touch and Pay". , the card can be used on 19 train systems and 11 buses, including the Osaka Municipal Subway and New Tram, the Keihan Electric Railway, and the Hankyu Railway.

System overview
PiTaPa is operated by the Surutto KANSAI Conference, along with magnetic pre-paid fare card system Surutto KANSAI. The conference consists of transit companies and bureaus using the system, and is headed by a private company by the name of Surutto KANSAI.

Unlike most other electronic fare collection systems, including JR East's Suica and JR West's ICOCA which operate on a "pre-pay" basis, PiTaPa is a "post-pay" card. Usage of the card is charged to the customer's account, and each month the balance owing is deducted from a designated bank account, as in a charge card. As such, a credit check is required to obtain a PiTaPa card, and the allowable balance is capped. Since June 2006, people over 20 can obtain a card secured by a deposit in lieu of the credit check, although these cards can only be used to pay transport fares or in limited stores, without the electronic money functions of a normal credit card.

Like Suica and ICOCA, the underlying technology behind PiTaPa is Sony's FeliCa smart card system.

Card types
"PiTaPa Basic Card" is the name given to the PiTaPa cards per se, and are issued by the Surutto KANSAI Conference.

Most traffic companies in the PiTaPa network issue PiTaPa-compatible cards of their brands, either on their own or jointly with other companies. The cards, called "PiTaPa Affiliate Cards" by the Surutto KANSAi Conference, typically are built within credit cards and have special services or discounts offered by its issuers.

Due to heavy marketing of the Affiliate Cards by the individual companies, the Basic Cards only comprise 10-20 percent of all the PiTaPa cards issued .

History
The concept to introduce a smart card fare system in the Kansai region was first announced on July 7, 2001, by the Surutto KANSAI Conference. The Conference initially announced in April 2002 that they are planning to consign operation of the system to Hitachi Ltd. and JCB, but switched to the Japan Research Institute and Sumitomo Mitsui Card Company in July 2003. The name "PiTaPa" was made public on February 25, 2003.

After four months of initial monitor testing, the service officially started on August 1, 2004, with three participating companies: Hankyu, Keihan, and Nose railways. Since then, the network has grown steadily. PiTaPa can be used on the ICOCA system starting on January 21, 2006 (see JR section below).

Companies and bureaus accepting PiTaPa
, the following parties take part in the PiTaPa network. The list is growing rapidly and subject to change.

Railroads

*1: These names of affiliate card were renamed and merged as "STACIA Card".

Buses

*1: These names of affiliate card were renamed and merged as "STACIA Card".

Other cards

JR
The JR West has its own ICOCA system, which operates on a "pre-pay" basis. PiTaPa can be used in place of an ICOCA card if the user charges money on to the card beforehand.

, PiTaPa cannot be used on the JR East's Suica system, nor Suica on PiTaPa. This has caused some confusion among users who assert that, since PiTaPa operates on the ICOCA system and since Suica and ICOCA are (virtually) interchangeable, PiTaPa must be accepted by JR East although that is not the case. However, the involving companies announced in 2004 that they are preparing to integrate the three systems.

See also
List of smart cards

References

External links
PiTaPa.com 
Surutto KANSAI company profile 
Transportation in Osaka, including information on the PiTaPa card

Rail transport in Osaka Prefecture
Fare collection systems in Japan
Contactless smart cards